These are the results of the Men's C-2 10000 metres competition in canoeing at the 1936 Summer Olympics.  The C-2 event is raced by two-man sprint canoes. The race took place on Friday, August 7.

Ten canoeists from five nations competed.

Medalists

Final
With only five teams competing, a final was held.

References
1936 Summer Olympics Official Report Volume 2. p. 1028.
Sports Reference.com 1936 C-2 10000 m results. - accessed September 1, 2008.

Men's C-2 10000